Mario Rivera Campesino (born 12 August 1977) is a Spanish professional football manager who is currently the head coach of the Brunei national football team.

Career 
Rivera started his managerial career with Leganés youth team in 2007. He then proceeded manage different local clubs, worked as a scout and analyst for Celtic and Atlético Madrid C. In 2018, he was appointed as the head coach of Brunei U21 team. In 2018 he joined East Bengal as an assistant coach and video analyst, along with head coach Alejandro Menéndez. He left after the end of the season and was replaced by Josep Ferré. On 23 January 2020, Rivera rejoined East Bengal as the head coach after Alejandro Menéndez stepped down.

On 1 January 2022, Rivera was again appointed as the head coach of East Bengal in Indian Super League, succeeding Manolo Díaz following the latter's midway resign during the tournament.

On 20 September the same year, he was unveiled as the head coach of the Brunei national football team, returning to the Abode of Peace four years after coaching the Under-21s for the 2018 Hassanal Bolkiah Trophy. He successfully coached the Wasps to qualification for the 2022 AFF Championship in November.

Managerial statistics

References

External links

1977 births
Living people
Sportspeople from Madrid
Spanish football managers
I-League managers
East Bengal Club managers
Spanish expatriate football managers
Spanish expatriate sportspeople in India
Expatriate football managers in India
Expatriate football managers in Brunei
Brunei national football team managers